

Canadian Football News in 1889
In October 1889, L.A. Hamilton of Winnipeg donated a trophy which would represent the best team in the northwest (Manitoba & Northwest Territories). Commencing with the 1890-91 season, the Northwest Championship became a tournament played over a weekend (Usually in October but occasionally played in May). The Hamilton Cup was awarded annually to the champion of the tournament. The final championship game was won by St.John's Rugby Football Club of Winnipeg in May 1898.

1889 Season

Final regular season standings
Note: GP = Games Played, W = Wins, L = Losses, T = Ties, PF = Points For, PA = Points Against, Pts = Points
*Bold text means that they have clinched the playoffs

League Champions

Playoffs

QRFU Final

ORFU Final

Dominion Championship
No dominion championship game was played.

References

 
Canadian Football League seasons